Zhou Yu ( 190s), courtesy name Renming, was a Chinese military general and politician who lived during the late Eastern Han dynasty of China. He was from Kuaiji Commandery, which is around present-day Shaoxing, Zhejiang. He had two brothers: Zhou Ang and Zhou Xin.

In 189, when the warlord Cao Cao was recruiting soldiers to participate in a campaign against the warlord Dong Zhuo, who controlled the Han central government from 189 to 192, Zhou Yu managed to draft 2,000 soldiers and he brought them along to join Cao Cao. He became a subordinate of the warlord Yuan Shao later and was appointed as the Inspector of Yu Province.

In 191, Zhou Yu fought on Yuan Shao's side at the Battle of Yangcheng against Yuan Shao's half-brother and rival Yuan Shu, whose forces were led by his ally Sun Jian. Although Zhou Yu gained the upper hand in the initial stages of the battle, he eventually lost to Sun Jian. In historical records, however, it is erroneously recorded that Zhou Yu's brother Zhou Ang was the one who was involved.

In 192, Zhou Yu and his brother Zhou Ang were defeated in a battle at Yinling County (陰陵縣; northwest of present-day Changfeng County, Anhui) against Yuan Shu's forces. After the battle, he returned to his home in Kuaiji Commandery, where he was murdered by Xu Gong, the Administrator of Wu Commandery.

See also
 Lists of people of the Three Kingdoms

References

 Chen, Shou (3rd century). Records of the Three Kingdoms (Sanguozhi).
 
 Fan, Ye (5th century). Book of the Later Han (Houhanshu).
 Pei, Songzhi (5th century). Annotations to Records of the Three Kingdoms (Sanguozhi zhu).

2nd-century births
Generals under Yuan Shao
Han dynasty politicians from Zhejiang
Officials under Yuan Shao
Political office-holders in Henan
Politicians from Shaoxing
Year of death unknown